Kristinn Magnússon (born 10 January 1981) is an Icelandic alpine skier. He competed in two events at the 2002 Winter Olympics.

References

1981 births
Living people
Kristinn Magnússon
Kristinn Magnússon
Alpine skiers at the 2002 Winter Olympics
Kristinn Magnússon
21st-century Icelandic people